Panathinaikos AC Rugby Team is the professional Rugby team of Panathinaikos A.C.,  the Athens-based multi-sport club. Founded in 2013, it is one of the newest rugby teams in Greece.

History
The first presence of the team took place in the season 2013-14 in the Unity Cup League and finished second after Attica Springboks RFC.

Roster

Staff

Women's team
Panathinaikos, in 2014, created also a women's rugby union team. The first presence of the team was in a friendly game against Aeolos Rugby women's team.

References

External links 
 Official page
 Official facebook page

Greek rugby union teams
Panathinaikos A.O.